The Windy City Pace was a harness race for 3-year-old Standardbred pacing horses. It had been run annually from 1983 to 2015 at Maywood Park in Melrose Park, Illinois, a suburb of Chicago.

The race was originally run during Maywood's spring meet, but since 1991 the race was run during the fall meet. In past years, elimination heats were required to determine the finalists for the main race. The race was the top race of a program that also features Maywood's other top stakes, the Abe Lincoln, the Galt, and the Cinderella.

Among the notable runnings of the Windy City was the 1987 race, where Bomb Rickles won the final at odds of 190-1.

In 2015 the purse was $180,000, Maywood Park closed that year. The venue was left abandoned until 2019 when it was demolished to make way for an Amazon distribution center.

Windy City Pace winners

References

 Windy City Pace: History
 Windy City Pace Final

Horse races in Illinois
1983 establishments in Illinois
Recurring sporting events established in 1983
Recurring sporting events disestablished in 2015